Mario Romeo (7 April 1915 - 1992) was an Italian pole vaulter who was 5th at the 1938 European Athletics Championships.

National records
Romeo has set several national records, the last of which held for nine years.
 Pole vault: 4.17 m ( Zurich, 23 August 1942) - record holder until 23 September 1951.

Achievements

National titles
Romeo won six national championships at individual senior level.

Italian Athletics Championships
Pole vault: 1938, 1939, 1943, 1945, 1947, 1950 (6)

See also
 Italy at the 1938 European Athletics Championships

References

External links
 Liste italiane 1908 - 1945, uomini 

1915 births
1992 deaths
Italian male pole vaulters
Sportspeople from Sardinia